Protein ENL is a protein that in humans is encoded by the MLLT1 gene.

Interactions 

MLLT1 has been shown to interact with CBX8.

References

Further reading

External links 
 

Transcription factors